Wrightia laevis is a species of plant in the family Apocynaceae. It is found in Queensland (Australia), Cambodia, China, Indonesia, Laos, Malaysia, Burma, Papua New Guinea, the Philippines, Singapore, Thailand, and Vietnam.

References

laevis
Gentianales of Australia
Flora of Queensland
Trees of China
Trees of Indo-China
Trees of Malesia
Trees of New Guinea
Least concern flora of Australia
Least concern biota of Queensland
Taxonomy articles created by Polbot